A determinative, also known as a taxogram or semagram, is an ideogram used to mark semantic categories of words in logographic scripts which helps to disambiguate interpretation. They have no direct counterpart in spoken language, though they may derive historically from glyphs for real words, and functionally they resemble classifiers in East Asian and sign languages. For example, Egyptian hieroglyphic determinatives include symbols for divinities, people, parts of the body, animals, plants, and books/abstract ideas, which helped in reading, but none of which were pronounced.

Cuneiform

In cuneiform texts of Sumerian, Akkadian and Hittite languages, many nouns are preceded or followed by a Sumerian word acting as a determinative; this specifies that the associated word belongs to a particular semantic group. These determinatives were not pronounced. In transliterations of Sumerian, the determinatives are  written in superscript in lower case. Whether a given sign is a mere determinative (not pronounced) or a Sumerogram (a logographic spelling of a word intended to be pronounced) cannot always be determined unambiguously since their use is not always consistent.

Examples are:
  ( or ) for male personal names
  for female personal name
  for trees and all things made of wood
  for countries
  for cities (but also often succeeding )
  for people and professions
  for ethnicities or multiple people
  ( or ) for gods and other divinities
  for buildings and temples
  for stars and constellations
  for birds.

Egyptian

In Ancient Egyptian hieroglyphs, determinatives came at the end of a word. Nearly every word – nouns, verbs, and adjectives – features a determinative, some of which become rather specific: "Upper Egyptian barley" or "excreted things". It is believed that they were used as much as word dividers as for semantic disambiguation. Examples include 𓀀 (man), 𓁐 (woman) and 𓀭 (god/king).

Determinatives are generally not transcribed, but when they are, they are transcribed by their number in Gardiner's Sign List.

Chinese

Some 90% of Chinese characters are determinative-phonetic compounds; the phonetic element and the determinative (called a radical) are combined to form a single glyph. Both the meaning and pronunciation of the characters have shifted over the millennia, to the point that the determinatives and phonetic elements are not always reliable guides; nevertheless, radicals are still important for indexing of characters such as in a dictionary.

Notes

References

External links
 

 
Sumerian words and phrases
Hieroglyphs